The 2017–18 McNeese State Cowgirls basketball team represented McNeese State University during the 2017–18 NCAA Division I women's basketball season. The Cowgirls, led by second-year head coach Kacie Cryer, played all their home games at Burton Coliseum. They are members of the Southland Conference.

Previous season
The Cowgirls finished the 2016–17 season with a 14–17 overall record and an 8–10 Southland Conference record to finish in sixth place. They advanced to the quarterfinals of the Southland women's tournament where they lost to Stephen F. Austin.

Roster
Sources:

Schedule
Sources:

|-
!colspan=9 style=| Exhibition

|-
!colspan=9 style=| Non-conference regular season

|-
!colspan=9 style=| Southland regular season

|-
!colspan=9 style=| Southland Tournament

See also
2017–18 McNeese State Cowboys basketball team

References

McNeese Cowgirls basketball seasons
McNeese State
McNeese State
McNeese State